Zinoro (之诺) is a luxury automobile marque owned by BMW Brilliance which specialises in electric vehicles. It was launched in 2013.

Products

Zinoro 1E
Zinoro 1E (之诺1E) is all-electric crossover, based on the BMW X1 (E84), was the first product of BMW Brilliance’s new brand and the first new energy vehicle (NEV) from a Chinese premium manufacturer. It was unveiled at the 2013 Guangzhou Auto Show.

The Zinoro 1E had a rear-mounted 125 kW electric motor and produced a peak torque of 250 N·m (184 lb-ft). Charging of the battery takes around 7.5 hours with a 16A wallbox.

After early 2014 the Zinoro 1E was available for leasing only in Beijing and Shanghai, and the company planned to open another showroom in Shenyang. Leasing starts at 400 RMB per day (~) or 7,400 RMB per month (~). The annual contract was planned to include the wall box charger, car registration plate, insurance, maintenance, and repairs. The Zinoro 1E is eligible for a NEV plate in Beijing, which had a registration quota of 20,000 new energy vehicles for 2014. In Shanghai license plates are auctioned for the equivalent of just under  . , electric cars received their license plate free of charge.

Zinoro 60H

Zinoro 60H (之诺60H) is a plug-in hybrid electric vehicle based on the second generation BMW X1 Long Wheelbase and previewed by the Zinoro Concept Next, launched in 2016.

References

External links

ZINORO pages: Chinese, English

BMW
Brilliance Auto
Electric vehicle manufacturers of China
Luxury motor vehicle manufacturers
Motor vehicle manufacturers of China
Vehicle manufacturing companies established in 2013